Craspedocephalus brongersmai, also known commonly as Brongersma's pit viper, is a species of venomous snake in the subfamily Crotalinae of the family Viperidae. The species is native to islands off the west coast of Sumatra, Indonesia. No subspecies are currently recognized.

Etymology
The specific name, brongersmai, is in honor of Dutch herpetologist Leo Brongersma.

Description
Scalation of C. brongersmai includes 19 (or 21) rows of dorsal scales at midbody, 136-150 ventral scales, 41-48 divided subcaudal scales, and 9-10 supralabial scales.

Geographic range
Craspedocephalus brongersmai is found in Indonesia, on the Mentawai islands of Siberut and Simeulue, which are located off the west coast of Sumatra.

The type locality given is "Lugu, Simalur, Sumatra" [= Lugu, Simeulue Island, Indonesia].

Habitat
The preferred natural habitat of C. brongersmai is forest.

Reproduction
The mode of reproduction of C. brongersmai is unknown.

References

Further reading
David P, Vogel G, Dubois A (2011). "On the need to follow rigorously the Rules of the Code for the subsequent designation of a nucleospecies (type species) for a nominal genus which lacked one: the case of the nominal genus Trimeresurus Lacépède, 1804 (Reptilia: Squamata: Viperidae)". Zootaxa 2992: 1-51.
Hoge AR (1969). "Um novo Trimeresurus de Simalur, Sumatra (Serpentes: Viperidae)". Ciência e Cultura, São Paulo 21 (2): 459–460. (Trimeresurus brongersmai, new species). (in Portuguese).
Hoge AR, De Lemos Romano SA (1974). "Notes on Trimeresurus brongersmai Hoge, 1969 (Serpentes: Viperidae: Crotalinae)". Memórias do Instituto Butantan 38: 147–158.

Reptiles described in 1969
Endemic fauna of Indonesia
Reptiles of Indonesia
Snakes of Asia
brongersmai